Cee or CEE may refer to:

 C, third letter of the Latin alphabet
 Cee, Spain, A Coruña, Galicia
 Center for Excellence in Education, US
 Central and Eastern Europe
 Centre for Environment Education
 Centre for the Economics of Education, London, England
 , now IECEE, an electrical standards body
 CEE 7 standard AC plugs and sockets
 CEE 17, now IEC 60309, connector standard
 , French abbreviation for European Economic Community
 Conjugated equine estrogens, a medication
 Consortium for Energy Efficiency, North America
 Converged Enhanced Ethernet